Potentilla inclinata is a species of flowering plant belonging to the family Rosaceae.

Its native range is Europe to Russian Far East and Iran.

References

inclinata